Marcus Ulpius Eubiotus Leurus was a Roman senator, who was active during the first part of the third century.

Life
He was suffect consul in one of the nundinia around the year 230. He is known entirely from inscriptions.

He was the son of Marcus Ulpius Leurus and Flavia Habroea, natives of Hypata. Two of his sons are known: Marcus Ulpius Flavius Tisamenus, and Marcus Ulpius Pupienus Maximus. Based on the similarity of his youngest son's name to that of the ephemeral emperor Marcus Clodius Pupienus Maximus, John H. Oliver suggests he may have married Pupiena Sextia Paulina Cethegilla, the emperor Pupienus's daughter, a supposition later supported by Ronald Syme. Oliver admits that while "we cannot tell whether any relationship existed between the Athenian family and the emperor", still "the similarity of the name and the social rank of the Athenian family at least invite speculation on the subject."

Portions of his cursus honorum are known from an inscription found in Athens praising his generosity during a time of famine. Leurus was eponymous archon of Athens for the term 229/230, and an agonothete of the Panathenaic Games.

Family tree

References

3rd-century Romans
Year of birth uncertain
Year of death unknown
Suffect consuls of Imperial Rome
Eponymous archons
Eubiotus Leurus